The 2012 Liga Indonesia Second Division season (Indonesian: Divisi Dua Liga Indonesia 2012) is the seventeenth edition of Liga Indonesia Second Division. The competition is organized by the Indonesia Amateur Football League Board (BLAI) of the PSSI breakaway leadership under La Nyalla Matalatti.

Participants

Relegated clubs from First Division

 PSAB Aceh Besar 
 Persibabar Bangka Barat 
 Persebsi Sibolga 
 Persika Karawang 
 Persikad Depok 
 Persibat Batang
 Penggung Raya FC 
 Persada Kragilan
 Timas FC kebontimun
 Sparta Cepogo FC
 Persesa Salakan
 Persekaba Blora 
 Persiko Kota Baru 
 Persista Sintang 
 Persikos Kota Sorong 
 Persikota Tikep 
 Persitoli Tolikara

Promoted clubs from Third Division

 Persibolmut 
 PS Dafi Mulia 
 Bintang Jaya Asahan 
 Thamrin Graha Metropolitan 
 Persikapur Purworejo 
 Maung Bandung FC 
 Martapura FC 
 Persekat Katingan
 Perseden Denpasar 
 PSK Kupang 
 Persipuja Puncak Jaya 
 Nusaina FC 
 Villa 2000 
 PS Batam 
 Gresik Putra 
 MBU Sidoarjo

First stage

Group Winner and runner-up qualify for 2nd round.

2012 Liga Indonesia Second Division
4